His Definitive Greatest Hits is a compilation album by American blues musician B.B. King. It was produced, sequenced & compiled by Richard M. Ganter and released on April 12, 1999 by Polygram Records.

Track listing

Charts

Certifications

References

External links
B.B. King official site
allmusic review.

1999 greatest hits albums
B.B. King compilation albums